Borovčanin is a Bosnian and Serbian surname, derived from the demonym of Borovac. It is traditionally found in Bosnia and Herzegovina. It may refer to:

Nenad Borovčanin (born 1979), Serbian politician and former boxer and European champion
Drago Borovčanin, Yugoslav political historian
Zoja Borovčanin, member of alternate rock group Lira Vega
Vladimir "Šento" Borovčanin, member of pop-rock group Jutro
Isidora Borovčanin, Bosnian model, 2014 Miss World Top Model
Vedran Borovčanin, Bosnian basketballer
Snežana Borovčanin, Bosnian skier
Ljubomir Borovčanin, Republic of Srpska  Police General and Commander of police special forces

See also
Borovica
Borovac
Borović

Serbian surnames